The Muhammad Ali dynasty ruled Egypt without interruption from Muhammad Ali's seizure of power in 1805 until the proclamation of the Republic in 1953. Eleven individuals (all of them men) ruled Egypt during the dynasty's 148-year lifespan. Due to the polygamous unions of several 19th-century rulers and their often numerous offspring, it is impossible to list all of the descendants of Muhammad Ali Pasha in a single chart. The family tree below is far from exhaustive; its mere aim is to show the family relationships between the dynasty's eleven rulers as well as its two regents.

Simplified version

See also
 List of monarchs of the Muhammad Ali Dynasty
 History of Egypt under the Muhammad Ali dynasty

External links

 
Dynasty genealogy
Muslim family trees